For information on the wildlife of Montserrat, see:

List of birds of Montserrat
List of mammals of Montserrat
List of amphibians and reptiles of Montserrat

Biota of Montserrat
Montserrat